Hush!  is a Japanese film directed by Ryōsuke Hashiguchi, starring Seiichi Tanabe, Kazuya Takahashi and Reiko Kataoka, released in 2001.

The theme song is "Hush Little Baby" from the album Hush performed by Bobby McFerrin and Yo-Yo Ma.

Cast

Awards
 2002 – Hochi Film Awards: Best Actor (Seiichi Tanabe)
 2002 – Kinema Junpo Awards: Best Actress (Reiko Kataoka)
 2003 – Blue Ribbon Awards: Best Actress (Reiko Kataoka)
 2003 – Yokohama Film Festival: Best Film, Best Director (Ryosuke Hashiguchi), Best Actor (Seiichi Tanabe)

References

External links

2001 films
Films directed by Ryōsuke Hashiguchi
2000s Japanese-language films
Japanese LGBT-related films
Gay-related films
2000s Japanese films